Brandon Jeremy Bess (born 13 December 1987) is a former international cricketer who made his debut for the West Indies cricket team in June 2010 as a late replacement for Nelon Pascal, who was injured pre-match.  A right-arm fast-medium bowler and lower order right-handed batsman, he plays first-class cricket for Guyana.

Cricket career

Early cricket
Bess made his debut for Guyana in January 2008, playing in a Carib Beer Cup match against Trinidad and Tobago.  He played only one further match in the 2007–08 season. He played more regularly in 2008–09, and appeared for West Indies A against the touring England XI, claiming a solitary wicket. The season also saw him make his first appearances in List A cricket, playing two matches for Guyana in November 2008.

His best bowling figures came early in the 2009–10 season, when he claimed four wickets in the first innings against Jamaica. He completed 2009–10 with a bowling average of 33.69, his best season average. His performances saw him appear for the West Indies A against the Zimbabweans in April 2010.

Test call-up
During the 2010 home series against South Africa, Bess made a surprise debut.  Nelon Pascal, himself in the team for the missing Ravi Rampaul, suffered a neck injury during the pre-match warm-up exercises. Bess, who was training at the High Performance Centre in Bridgetown was rushed to the ground, not arriving until the second over of the match. Bess, who came into the game with a first-class bowling average of 48.80, opened the bowling for the West Indies, but saw opposition captain Graeme Smith score three boundaries off his first over. He was taken off after his second over as Chris Gayle turned to spinner Shane Shillingford. He returned in the twentieth over, and claimed the wicket of nightwatchman Paul Harris.  He continued to bowl expensively, with 65 runs coming off the 9 overs that he bowled in the first innings.  Cricinfo's Siddhartha Talya was unimpressed with his performance:

References

External links
 

1987 births
Living people
People from Mahaica-Berbice
West Indies Test cricketers
Guyanese cricketers
Guyana cricketers